Eulobomyia is a genus of flies in the family Tachinidae.

Species
Eulobomyia neotropica (Woodley & Arnaud, 2008)

Distribution
Trinidad and Tobago, Costa Rica, Mexico, Brazil, Colombia.

References

Diptera of North America
Diptera of South America
Monotypic Brachycera genera
Exoristinae
Tachinidae genera